Speak Like You Talk is the debut studio album by American rock band Letlive. Even though there are 12 songs on the album, there at 69 tracks in total. Of these tracks, eight are individual full-length songs, 3 tracks make up the collective song "2 in 6.8 Billion", and 58 tracks make up the hidden song which is revealed as "You are Not Your Username" followed by a Roman numeral for each track. In the CD cover, under the lyrics for "2 in 6.8 Billion", it reads "this is fellowship not follow ship (as it sinks) not to be confused as this ships bow martyr." Which is what the hidden song opens with. The mention of martyrs is uncanny to the first track of Letlive's next album.

Track listing

Personnel
Jason Aalon Butler – lead vocals
Christian Johansen – bass guitar
Omid Majdi – guitar
Ben Sharp – guitar
Adam Castle – drums, percussion

Non-band personnel
Rollie Ulug – Mixer
Jonathan Vigil (The Ghost Inside)– Additional Vocals (track 4)
Tanner McCardle – Additional Vocals (track 5)
Devin Taylor – Album Artwork
Mishka Bier – Band Photographer
Amanda Soto – City Photographer

2005 debut albums
Letlive albums